Stephen C. Collins  was an American minor league baseball player-manager.

Infielder Collins spent eleven seasons in the minor leagues including a three-year stint as the player-manager for the Kinston Eagles of the Coastal Plain League (1947–1949). At the time, the Eagles were an affiliate of the Atlanta Crackers. Collins' squads were able to capture the Coastal Plain League crown in 1947 and made it to the championship series in the other two years. Contributing greatly to these teams was Collins himself who hit .353 with 91 RBI in 1947 and .311 with 90 RBI in 1948. He was named to the Coastal Plain League All-Star team for each of those seasons.

Sources
 Articles
 The Professional Baseball Players Database 5.0

External links

1918 births
Possibly living people
Minor league baseball managers
Baseball player-managers
Burlington Bees players
Rochester Red Wings players
Knoxville Smokies players
Mobile Bears players
Toledo Mud Hens players
Atlanta Crackers players
Kinston Eagles players
Moultrie Cubs players
Wilmington Pirates players
Greenwood Tigers players
Rocky Mount Leafs players
New Bern Bears players